The Cathedral Basilica of Our Lady of the Assumption Also Aguascalientes Cathedral It is the main Catholic building of the city of Aguascalientes in Mexico, and one of the emblematic monuments of the city. It is located in the Plaza de la Patria.

The construction of the current temple was initiated by the priest Antonio Flores de Acevedo in 1704, finishing the parish priest Manuel Colón de Larreátegui in 1738. The image of the Virgin of the Assumption was brought from Spain.

The construction consists of atrial bard composed of quarry pillars and trellis with lateral accesses and to the north a sundial on a pillar. Twin towers showing a neoclassical style on their curved pediments. The main front of the temple is in its entirety carved in pink quarry, which consists of three bodies and auction; In the first one the access is through an arch of half point with key of archangel; To the sides salomonic columns of vegetal reliefs and compound capital. In the lateral façades, the doorway of the accesses with a semicircular arch is highlighted, flanked by smooth columns that support entablature with broken fronton and florones at the sides.

See also
Roman Catholicism in Mexico
Our Lady of the Assumption

References

Roman Catholic cathedrals in Mexico
Roman Catholic churches completed in 1738
Basilica churches in Mexico
18th-century Roman Catholic church buildings in Mexico